Gatorhythms is a blues album by Marcia Ball. It is her fifth album and was released in 1989 by Rounder Records.

Track listing

Personnel
 Marcia Ball - vocals, piano, accordion and organ
 Don Bennett - bass
 Rodney Craig - drums, cowbell and triangle
 Stephen Bruton - electric, acoustic and slide guitars
 Derek O'Brien - guitar on tracks 1, 7 and 9
 James Hinkle - rhythm guitar on tracks 2 and 4
 Jesse Taylor - guitar solos on tracks 4 and 10
 Mark Kazanoff - tenor and baritone saxophones
 Keith Winking - trumpet
 John Blondell - trombone
 Angela Strehli - background vocals
 Lou Ann Barton - background vocals

References

1989 albums
Blues albums by American artists
Marcia Ball albums
Rounder Records albums